HMS Derwent was a Hawthorn Leslie-type River-class destroyer ordered by the Royal Navy under the 1901 – 1902 Naval Estimates.  Named after the River Derwent in central England, she was the second ship to carry this name.

Construction
She was laid down on 12 June 1902 at the Hawthorn Leslie shipyard at Hebburn-on-Tyne and launched on 14 February 1903.  She was completed on 1 July 1904.  Her original armament was to be the same as the turtleback torpedo boat destroyers that preceded her.  In 1906 the Admiralty decided to upgrade the armament by landing the five 6-pounder naval guns and shipping three 12-pounder 8 hundredweight (cwt) guns.  Two were mounted abeam at the foc'x'le break and the third gun was mounted on the quarterdeck.

Pre-War
After commissioning she was assigned to the East Coast Destroyer Flotilla of the 1st Fleet and based at Harwich.

In April 1909 she was assigned to the 3rd Destroyer Flotilla on its formation at Harwich. She was assigned to the 5th Destroyer Flotilla of the 2nd Fleet with a nucleus crew.

On 30 August 1912 the Admiralty directed that all destroyer classes were to be designated by letters.  The ships of the River class were assigned to the E class.  After 30 September 1913, she was known as an E-class destroyer and had the letter ‘E’ painted on the hull below the bridge area and on either the fore or aft funnel.

World War I
The 9th Flotilla was a patrol flotilla operating anti-submarine and counter-mining patrols in the Firth of Forth area. By September 1914, she was deployed to the Dover Patrol based at Portsmouth. Here she provided anti-submarine and counter-mining patrols and defended the Dover Barrage.

In August 1915 with the amalgamation of the 7th and 9th Flotillas, she was assigned to the 1st Destroyer Flotilla when it was redeployed to Portsmouth in November 1916.  She was equipped with depth charges for use in anti-submarine patrols, escorting of merchant ships and defending the Dover Barrage.  In the spring of 1917 as the convoy system was being introduced the 1st Flotilla was employed in escort duties for convoys through the English Channel for the remainder of the war.

Loss
On 2 May 1917 she struck a contact mine, laid by German submarine , off Le Havre, France. She sank 2 cables north of Whistle Buoy at position  with the loss of 58 officers and men.

Pennant numbers

References

Bibliography

 

 

River-class destroyers
Ships built on the River Tyne
1903 ships
Maritime incidents in 1917
World War I shipwrecks in the English Channel
Ships sunk by mines